Lord Lawson may refer to:

Jack Lawson (1881–1965), Lord Lawson of Beamish, British trade unionist and a Labour politician
Nigel Lawson (born 1932), Lord Lawson of Blaby, British Conservative politician and journalist